Elena Rivera may refer to: 
 Elena Rivera Mirano (born 1951), Filipino scholar;
 Elena Rivera (born 1992), Spanish actress.